The Western Xia or the Xi Xia, officially the Great Xia, also known as the Tangut Empire, and known as Mi-nyak to the Tanguts and Tibetans, was a Tangut-led Buddhist imperial dynasty of China that existed from 1038 to 1227.

The capital of Western Xia was Xingqing (modern Yinchuan), another major Xia city and archaeological site is Khara-Khoto. Western Xia was annihilated by the Mongols in 1227. Most of its written records and architecture were destroyed, so the founders and history of the empire remained obscure until 20th-century research in China and the West. Today the Tangut language and its unique script are extinct, only fragments of Tangut literature remain. 

The Western Xia occupied the area around the Hexi Corridor, a stretch of the Silk Road, the most important trade route between northern China and Central Asia. They made significant achievements in literature, art, music, and architecture, which was characterized as "shining and sparkling". Their extensive stance among the other empires of the Liao, Song, and Jin was attributable to their effective military organizations that integrated cavalry, chariots, archery, shields, artillery (cannons carried on the back of camels), and amphibious troops for combat on land and water.

Name 
The corresponding Chinese name,  ("White High Great Xia State"), was also used. Chinese and Japanese scholars commonly interpret the first two words as "upper reaches of the White River", which was possibly referring to the Yellow River. Kepping (1994) proposed the translation "the Kingdom of the Great Xia of the White and Lofty", and suggested that the name refers to a peak in the Helan Mountains named the "White and Lofty Mother". The region was known to the Tanguts as /mjɨ-njaa/, and to the Tibetans as Minyak. Another name the Tanguts used for their state was /khjɨ-dwuu-lhjij/, which means the "State of Ten Thousand Secrets". "Western Xia" or "Xi Xia" is the state's Chinese name. "Western" refers to its location to the west of the Liao (916–1125) and Jin (1115–1234) dynasties, as well as the Song. "Xia" (pointing to the Xia dynasty) is a historical name for the region that originated from the 5th-century Hu Xia dynasty.

The name Tangut is derived from a form first found in the Orkhon inscriptions dated to 735, which is transcribed in Chinese as Tangwu or Tangute (Tangghut (Tangɣud) in Mongolian). Tangut was used a common name for certain tribes in the Amdo-Kokonor-Gansu region until the 19th century. The Tanguts called themselves Minag, transcribed in Chinese as Mianyao or Miyao.

History

Origins 

The Tanguts originally came from the Tibet-Qinghai region. According to Chinese records, which called them the Dangxiang, the Tanguts were descended from the Western Qiang people, and occupied the steppes around Qinghai Lake and the mountains to its south.

In 608, the Tanguts helped the Sui dynasty defeat the Tuyuhun, however they were betrayed by the Sui forces, who took the chance to loot the Tanguts. In 635, they were requested to serve as guides for Emperor Taizong's campaign against Tuyuhun, but the Tang forces double crossed them in a surprise attack and seized thousands of livestock. In retaliation, the Tanguts attacked the Tang and killed thousands of their soldiers.

By the 650s, the Tanguts had left their homeland to escape pressure from the Tibetans and migrated eastward to what are now modern Shanxi and Shaanxi provinces. In 584-5 Tuoba Ningzong led the first group of Tanguts to submit to the Sui. In 628-9 another group under the leadership of Xifeng Bulai surrendered to the Tang. After the Tuyuhun were defeated in 635, the Tanguts under Tuoba Chici also surrendered. The 340,000 Tanguts were divided into 32 jimi prefectures under the control of Tangut chieftains appointed as prefects. Another wave of Tanguts entered Tang territory in 692, adding as many as 200,000 persons to the population in Lingzhou and Xiazhou. In 721-2, Tuoba Sitai, a descendant of Tuoba Chici, aided the Tang in putting down a Sogdian-led revolt in Shuofang. By the time of the An Lushan Rebellion in the 750s, the Tanguts had become the primary local power in the Ordos region in northern Shaanxi. In the 760s, the military commander, Ashina Sijian, harassed six Tangut tribes and took their camels and horses. The Tanguts fled west across the Yellow River and started working for the Tibetans as guides on raiding expeditions. In 764, the Tanguts joined the Tibetans and Uyghurs in supporting the Tang rebel Pugu Huaien. After the Tang reasserted their authority, a descendant of Tuoba Chici, Tuoba Chaoguang, was put in charge of the loyal Tanguts. The Yeli, Bali, and Bozhou clans continued to side with the Tibetans, however the Tanguts also came under Tibetan predation, and frontier settlements continued switching between Tang and Tibetan control for many years. In 806, the Acting Minister of Works, Du You, admitted that they treated the Tanguts badly:

In 814 the Tang appointed a Commissioner for Pacifying the Tanguts to Youzhou (modern Otog Banner), however this did not resolve the Tangut problem. In 820 the Tanguts were subjected to the tyranny of a local governor, Tian Jin. They retaliated by joining the Tibetans in raids on Tang garrisons. Sporadic conflict with the Tanguts lasted until the 840s when they rose in open revolt against the Tang, but the rebellion was suppressed. Eventually the Tang court was able to mollify the Tanguts by admonishing their frontier generals and replacing them with more disciplined ones. The Tanguts also fought against the Uyghurs after the collapse of the Uyghur Khaganate because they both wanted to monopolize the horse trade which passed through Lingzhou.

Dingnan Jiedushi

In 873, the senior Tangut leader at Xiazhou, Tuoba Sigong, occupied Youzhou and declared himself prefect. When Chang'an fell to Huang Chao in 880, Sigong led a Chinese-Tangut army to assist Tang forces in driving out the rebels. For his service, he was granted in 881 control of Xiazhou, Youzhou, Suizhou, Yinzhou, and later also Jingbian. Together the territory was called Dingnan Jiedushi, also known as Xiasui, centered on modern Yulin, Shaanxi. After the Huang Chao rebellion's defeat in 883, Sigong was granted the dynastic surname Li and enfeoffed as "Duke of Xia". In 878, the Shatuo chieftain Li Guochang attacked the Tanguts but was repelled by a Tuyuhun intervention.

Sigong died in 886 and was succeeded by his brother Sijian. In 905 Li Keyong's independent regime allied with the Khitans, which pushed the Tanguts into an alliance with Later Liang, which awarded the Dingnan rulers with honorary titles. Sijian died in 908 and was succeeded by his adopted son Yichang, who was murdered by his officer Gao Zongyi in 909. Gao Zongyi was himself murdered by soldiers of Dingnan and was replaced by Yichang's uncle, Renfu, who was a popular officer in the army. In 910 Dingnan came under a monthlong siege by the forces of Qi and Jin but was able to repel the invasion with the aid of Later Liang. In 922 Renfu sent 500 horses to Luoyang, perhaps to aid the Later Liang in fighting the Shatuo. In 924 Renfu was enfeoffed as "Prince of Shuofang" by Later Tang. When Renfu died in 933, Later Tang tried to replace his son, Yichao, with a Sogdian governor, An Congjin. An Congjin besieged Xiazhou with 50,000 soldiers, but the Tanguts mounted a successful defensive by rallying the tribes and stripping the countryside of any resources. The Later Tang army was forced to retreat after three months. Despite Later Tang aggression, Yichao made peace with them by sending 50 horses as an offering.

Yichao died in 935 and was succeeded by his brother Yixing. Yixing discovered a plot by his brother, Yimin, to overthrow him in 943. Yimin fled to Chinese territory, but was returned to Xiazhou for execution. Over 200 clan members were implicated in the plot, resulting in a purge of the core ranks. Yimin's post was taken by a loyal official, Renyu. Not long afterward, Renyu was killed by the Yemu Qiang, who departed for Chinese territory. In 944 Yixing may have attacked the Liao dynasty on behalf of the Later Jin. The sources are not clear on the event. In 948 Yixin requested permission to cross the border and attack the Yemu Qiang but was refused. Instead Yixing attacked a neighboring circuit under encouragement from the rebel Li Shouzhen, but retreated upon encountering an imperial force. In 952 the Yeji people north of Qingzhou rebelled, causing the Tanguts significant difficulty. Honorary titles were given out by the Later Han to appease local commanders, including Yixing. In 960 Dingnan came under attack by Northern Han and successfully repelled invading forces. In 962 Yixing offered horses as tribute to the Song dynasty. Yixing died in 967 and was succeeded by his son, Kerui.

Kerui died in 978 and was succeeded by Jiyun. Jiyun ruled for only a year before dying in 980. His son was still an infant, so Jiyun's brother, Jipeng, assumed leadership. Jipeng did not go through the traditional channel of acquiring consent from the elders, which caused dissent among the Tangut elites. The Tangut prefect of Suizhou challenged Jipeng's succession. In 982 Jipeng fled to the Song court and surrendered control of Dingnan Jiedushi. His brother or cousin, Jiqian, did not agree to this and refused to submit to Song administration. Jiqian led a group of bandit holdouts and resisted Song control. In 984, the Song attacked his camp and captured his mother and wife, but he narrowly escaped. He rebounded from this defeat by capturing Yinzhou the next year. Along with Yinzhou, Jiqian captured large amounts of supply, allowing him to increase his following. In 986, Jiqian submitted to the Khitans and in 989, Jiqian married into Khitan nobility. Jiqian also made symbolic obeisance to the Song, but the Song remained unconvinced of his intentions. Jipeng was sent by the Song to destroy Jiqian, but he was defeated in battle on 6 May 994, and fled back to Xiazhou. Jiqian sent tribute on 9 September as well as his younger brother on 1 October to the Song court. Emperor Taizong of Song was receptive of these gestures, but Jiqian returned to raiding Song territory the next year. In April 996, Taizong sent troops to suppress Jiqian, who raided Lingzhou in May and again in November 997. For a brief period after 998, Jiqian accepted Song suzerainty, until the fall of 1001 when he began raiding again. Jiqian died on 6 January 1004 from an arrow wound. His son and successor, Deming, proved to be more amicable towards the Song than his predecessor.

Jingzong (1038–1048)

Deming sent tribute missions to both the Liao dynasty and the Song dynasty. At the same time he expanded Tangut territory to the west. In 1028, he sent his son Yuanhao to conquer the Ganzhou Uyghur Kingdom. Two years later the Guiyi Circuit surrendered to the Tanguts. Yuanhao invaded the Qinghai region as well but was repelled by the newly risen Tibetan kingdom of Tsongkha. In 1032, Yuanhao annexed the Tibetan confederation of Xiliangfu, and soon after his father died, leaving him ruler of the Tangut state.

Upon his father's death, Yuanhao adopted the Tangut surname of Weiming (Tangut: Nweimi) for his clan. He levied all able bodied men between 15 and 60 years of age, providing him with a 150,000 strong army. By 1036, he had annexed both the Ganzhou Uyghur Kingdom and the Guiyi Circuit to his west. In the same year, the Tangut script was disseminated for use in the Tangut government and translations of Chinese and Tibetan works began at once. The script's creation is attributed to Yeli Renrong and work on it likely began during the reign of Deming.

In 1038, Yuanhao declared himself emperor (wu zu or Blue Son of Heaven), posthumously Emperor Jingzong of Western Xia, of the Great Xia with his capital at Xingqing in modern Yinchuan. Jingzong expanded the bureaucratic apparatus mirroring Chinese institutional practices. A Secretariat (Zhongshu sheng), Bureau of Military Affairs (Shumi yuan), Finance Office (San si), Censorate (Yushi tai), and 16 bureaus (shiliu si) under the supervision of a chancellor (shangshu ling) were created. Jingzong enacted a head shaving decree that ordered all his countrymen to shave the top of their heads so that if within three days, someone had not followed his order, they were allowed to be killed.

In response, the Song dynasty offered to bestow ranks on the Tanguts, which Jingzong rejected. The Song then cut off border trade and put a bounty on his head. The Xia's chief military leader, Weiming Shanyu, also fled to seek asylum with the Song, however he was executed at Youzhou. What ensued was a prolonged war with the Song dynasty which resulted in several victories at great cost to the Xia economy.

In the winter of 1039–1040, Jingzong laid siege to Yanzhou (now Yan'an) with over 100,000 troops. The prefect of Yanzhou, Fan Yong, gave contradictory orders to his military deputy, Liu Ping, making him move his forces (9,000) in random directions until they were defeated by Xia forces (50,000) at Sanchuan Pass. Liu Ping was taken captive. Despite the defenders' mediocre performance, Jingzong was forced to lift the siege and retreat to a ring of forts overlooking Yanzhou, when heavy winter snows set in. A Song army of 30,000 returned later that winter under the command of Ren Fu. They were ambushed at Haoshuichuan and annihilated. Despite such victories, Jingzong failed to make any headway against Song fortifications, garrisoned by 200,000 troops on rotation from the capital, and remained unable to seize any territory. In 1042, Jingzong advanced south and surrounded the fort of Dingchuan. The defending commander Ge Huaimin lost his nerve and decided to run, abandoning his troops to be slaughtered. Again, Jingzong failed to gain significant territory. Half his soldiers had died from attrition and after two years, Xia could no longer support his military endeavors. Tangut forces began suffering small defeats, being turned back by Song forces at Weizhou and Linzhou.

The Liao dynasty took advantage of the Song's dire predicaments by increasing annual tribute payments by 100,000 units of silk and silver (each). The Song appealed to the Liao for help, and as a result, Emperor Xingzong of Liao invaded Western Xia with a force of 100,000 in 1044. Liao forces enjoyed an initial victory but failed to take the Xia capital and were brutally mauled by Jingzong's defenders. According to Song spies, there was a succession of carts bearing Liao dead across the desert. Having exhausted his resources, Jingzong made peace with the Song, who recognized him as the ruler of Xia lands and agreed to pay an annual tribute of 250,000 units of silk, silver, and tea.

Toward the end of the war, Jingzong took the intended bride of his son, Lady Moyi, as his concubine. Jingzong's designated heir, Ninglingge, was the son of the Yeli empress, whose uncle Yeli Wangrong was concerned about the development. Ninglingge was thus arranged to marry the daughter of Wangrong, who planned to kill the emperor on the eve of the wedding. The plot leaked and Wangrong as well as four other Yeli conspirators were executed. The Yeli empress was demoted and Lady Moyi was installed in her place. Another concubine, Lady Mocang, bore the emperor a male child in 1047, named Liangzuo, who was raised by Mocang Epang. The disinherited heir apparent stabbed Jingzong in the nose and fled to Mocang Epang's residence where he was arrested and executed. Jingzong died the next day on 19 January 1048 at the age of 44.

Yizong (1048–1068)

After Emperor Jingzong of Western Xia died in 1048, a council of elders selected his cousin as the new ruler. Mocang Epang objected on grounds of primogeniture and put forth his nephew, the son of Jingzong and Lady Mocang, as candidate. No dissent was forthcoming, so the two-year-old Liangzuo became emperor, posthumously known as Emperor Yizong of Western Xia. In 1056 the empress dowager died. In 1061 Yizong eliminated Mocang Epang and married Lady Liang, formerly the wife of Epang's son. Yizong appointed Lady Liang's brother, Liang Yimai, as palace minister. This would start two generations of Liang dominance in Xia. During Yizong's reign, he attempted to enact more Chinese forms of governance by replacing Tangut rites with Chinese court ritual and dress, which was opposed by the Liang faction that favored Tangut forms. At the same time, Song and Xia emissaries regularly exchanged insults. The emperor supported sinification through the import of Chinese books, revived the use of his Chinese surname Li and other Chinese protocols, and pursued accommodation with the Song dynasty in border disputes and opening of trade. However, these diplomatic overtures were squandered by arrogant Song representatives who insulted the Xia envoy. The Liang clan was reportedly of Han Chinese ancestry, albeit assimilated into Tangut culture, but their faction would later lead the opposition to the pro-Chinese policy. The Han Chinese empresses of the Liang clan, Paul Forage notes, were more aggressive in their stance against the Song dynasty than the emperors they were representing.

In 1064, Yizong raided the Song dynasty. In the fall of 1066, he mounted two more raids and in September, an attack on Qingzhou was launched. The Tangut forces destroyed several fortified settlements. Song forces were surrounded for three days before cavalry reinforcements arrived. Yizong was wounded by a crossbow and forced to retreat. Tangut forces attempted another raid later on but failed, and a night attack by Song forces scattered the Tangut army. Yizong regrouped at Qingtang and launched another attack on Qingzhou in December but withdrew after threats by Emperor Yingzong of Song to escalate the conflict. The next year, the Song commander Chong E attacked and captured Suizhou.

Yizong died in January 1068, presumably from his wounds, at the age of 20.

Huizong (1068–1086)

The seven-year-old Bingchang, posthumously Emperor Huizong of Western Xia, succeeded his father, Emperor Yizong of Western Xia. Huizong's reign began with an inconclusive war with the Song dynasty in 1070-1 over Suizhou. In 1072 Huizong's sister was married to Linbuzhi (Rinpoche), the son of the Tsongkha ruler, Dongzhan. These events occurred under the regency of the Empress Dowager Liang and her brother, Liang Yimai. Huizong was married to one of Yimai's daughters to ensure the continued control of the Liang over the imperial Weiming clan. In 1080 Huizong rebelled against his mother's dominance by discarding with Tangut ritual in favor of Chinese ceremonies. A year later a plot by Huizong and his concubine, Li Qing, to turn over the Xia's southern territory to the Song was uncovered. Li Qing was executed and Huizong was imprisoned. The emperor's loyalists immediately rallied their forces to oppose Liang rule while Yimai tried to in vain to summon them with the imperial silver paiza.

Seeing the infighting breaking out in the Xia, the Song decided to go on the offensive. In 1081, the Song dynasty launched a five-pronged attack on the Xia. After initial victories, Song forces failed to take the capital of Xia, Xingqing, and remained on the defensive for the next three years. Xia counterattacks also experienced initial success before failing to take Lanzhou multiple times. In 1085, the war ended with the death of Emperor Shenzong of Song.

In the summer of 1081, the five Song armies invaded Western Xia. Chong E defeated a Xia army, killing 8,000. In October, Li Xian took Lanzhou. On 15 October, Liu Changzuo's 50,000 strong army met a Xia force of 30,000 led by the Empress Regent Liang's brother. Liu's commanders advised him to take a defensive position, but he refused, and led a contingent of shield warriors with two ranks of crossbowmen and cavalry behind, with himself leading at the front with two shields. The battle lasted for several hours before the Xia forces retreated, suffering 2,700 casualties. Afterwards, Liu captured a large supply of millet at the town of Mingsha, and headed towards Lingzhou. Liu's vanguard attacked the town's gate before the defenders had a chance to close it, dealing several hundred casualties, and seizing more than 1,000 cattle before retreating. Liu wanted Gao Zunyu to help him take Lingzhou, but Gao refused. Then Liu suggested they take the Xia capital instead, to which Gao also refused, and instead took it as a slight that he could not take Lingzhou. Gao relayed his version of events to the Song court, then had Liu removed from command, merging the two forces.

By November, the Xia had abandoned the middle of the Ordos plateau, losing Xiazhou. On 20 November, Wang Zhongzheng took Youzhou and slaughtered its inhabitants. At this point Wang became concerned that he would run out of supplies and quarreled with Chong E over provisions. He also forbade his troops from cooking their meals because he feared it would alert Xia raiders of their position. His troops became ill from their uncooked food, started to starve, and came under attack by enemy cavalry anyway. Wang was ordered to withdraw while Chong E covered his retreat. Wang lost 20,000 men.

On 8 December, Gao Zunyu decided to attack Lingzhou, only to realize he had forgotten to bring any siege equipment, and there were not enough trees around for their construction. Gao took out his frustration on Liu Changzuo, who he tried to have executed. Liu's troops were on the verge of mutiny before Fan Chuncui, a Circuit judge, convinced Gao to reconcile with Liu. On 21 December, Xia forces breached the dikes along the Yellow River and flooded the camps of the two besieging Song armies, forcing them to retreat. Xia harassment turned the retreat into a rout.

By the end of 1081, only Chong E remained in active command. In September 1082, the Xia counterattacked with a 300,000 strong army, laying siege to Yongle, a fortress town west of Mizhi. The Xia sent out cavalry to prevent Song relief attempts. The defending commander, Xu Xi, deployed his troops outside the town gates but refused to attack the enemy troops while they forded the river. Then he refused to let his troops in when the Tangut Iron Hawk cavalry attacked, decimating the defending army. With the capture of Yongle, the Song lost 17,300 troops.

In March 1083, Xia forces attacked Lanzhou. The defending commander, Wang Wenyu, led a small contingent out at night and made a surprise attack on the Xia encampment, forcing them to retreat. The Tanguts made two more attempts to take Lanzhou in April and May but failed on both accounts. Their simultaneous attack on Linzhou also failed. After multiple defeats, the Xia offered peace demands to the Song, which they refused. In January 1084, Xia forces made a last attempt to take Lanzhou. The siege lasted for 10 days before the Tangut army ran out of supplies and was forced to retreat.

The war ended in 1085 with the death of Emperor Shenzong in April. In exchange for 100 Chinese prisoners, the Song returned four of the six captured towns. Hostilities between the Song and Xia would flare up again five years later, and conflict would continue sporadically until the Song lost Kaifeng in the Jingkang incident of 1127.

Huizong was returned to his throne in 1083. Liang Yimai died in 1085 and his son, Liang Qipu, succeeded his position as chief minister. The Empress Dowager Liang also died later that year. In 1086 Huizong passed away at the age of 26.

Chongzong (1086–1139)

The three-year-old Qianshun succeeded his father, Emperor Huizong of Western Xia, as emperor, posthumously Emperor Chongzong of Western Xia. His mother, the new Empress Dowager Liang, the younger sister of Liang Qipu, ruled as regent. The Song dynasty continued to campaign against the Xia in 1091 and 1093. In 1094, Rende Baozhuang and Weiming Awu slew Liang Qipu and exterminated his clan. In 1096 the Song stopped paying tribute to the Xia and the next year, launched an "advance and fortify" campaign centered on guarding key locations along river valleys and mountains to erode the Xia position. From 1097 to 1099, the Song army constructed 40 fortifications across the Ordos plateau. In 1098, the Empress Regent Liang sent a 100,000 strong army to recapture Pingxia. The Tangut army was completely defeated in their attempt to dislodge the Song from their high ground position, and their generals Weiming Amai and Meiledubu were both captured. Empress Dowager Liang died in 1099, apparently poisoned by assassins from the Liao dynasty. At the same time, the Tanguts were also involved in a war with the Zubu to their north.

In 1103, the Song annexed Tsongkha and spent the following year weeding out native resistance. The expansion of Song territory threatened the Xia's southern border, resulting in Tangut incursions in 1104 and 1105. Eventually the Xia launched an all out attack on Lanzhou and Qingtang. However, after the Advance and Fortify campaign of 1097–1099, Xia forces were no longer able to defeat Song positions. Failing to take major cities, the Tangut forces went on a rampage, killing tens of thousands of local civilians. The next year, Chongzong made peace with the Song, but was unable to clearly demarcate their borders, leading to another war in 1113.

In 1113, the Xia started building fortifications in disputed territory with the Song, and took the Qingtang region. Incensed at this provocation, Emperor Huizong of Song dispatched Tong Guan to evict the Tanguts. In 1115, 150,000 troops under the command of Liu Fa penetrated deep into Xia territory and slaughtered the Tangut garrison at Gugulong. Meanwhile, Wang Hou and Liu Chongwu attacked the newly built Tangut fortress of Zangdihe. The siege ended in failure and the death of half the invasion force. Wang bribed Tong to keep the number of casualties a secret from the emperor. The next year, Liu Fa and Liu Chongwu took a walled Tangut city called Rendequan. Another 100,000 troops were sent against Zangdihe and succeeded in taking the fortress. The Xia made a successful counterattack in the winter of 1116–1117. Despite piling casualties on the Song side, Tong was adamant about eradicating the Xia once and for all. He gave orders for Liu Fa to lead 200,000 into the heart of the Xia empire, aiming straight at the capital region. It quickly became apparent that this was a suicide mission. The Song army was met outside the city by an even larger Tangut army led by the Xia prince, Chage. The Tangut army surrounded the Song forces, killing half of them, with the remaining falling back during the night. The Tanguts pursued the Song and defeated them again the next day. Liu was beheaded. A ceasefire was called in 1119 and Huizong issued an apology to Xia.

In 1122, the Jürchen Jin dynasty took the Southern Capital of the Liao dynasty, and the remaining Khitans fled in two groups to the west. One group led by Xiao Gan fled to Xia where they set up a short lived Xi dynasty that lasted only five months before Gan died at the hands of his own troops. The other group, led by Yelü Dashi, joined Emperor Tianzuo of Liao at the Xia border. In the early summer of 1123, Dashi was captured by the Jin and forced to lead them to Tianzuo's camp, where the entire imperial family except for Tianzuo and one son were captured. Tianzuo sought refuge with Chongzong, who while initially receptive, changed his mind after warnings from the Jurchens and declared himself a vassal of Jin in 1124.

Domestically the reign of Chongzong saw a formal consolidation of the relationship between the imperial court and the great clans, whose positions were assured in legal documents. After his mother's death in 1099, Chongzong stripped the Rende clan of its military power. Rende Baozhuang was demoted. Chongzong's brother, Chage, was given command of the Tangut army, which he led to many victories against the Song. A state school was established with 300 students supported by government stipends. A "civilian" faction arose under the leadership of the imperial Prince Weiming Renzhong, who often denounced Chage for corruption and abuse of power. Chongzong shuffled appointments to play the two factions against each other. In 1105, Chongzong married a Liao princess, who along with her son, apparently died of heartbreak in 1125 when the Khitan emperor was captured by the Jurchens. In 1138, the penultimate year of his reign, Chongzong took the daughter of Ren Dejing as his empress.

Chongzong died at the age of 56 in the summer of 1139.

Renzong (1139–1193)

The 16-year-old Renxiao succeeded his father, Emperor Chongzong of Western Xia, as emperor, posthumously Emperor Renzong of Western Xia. His mother was the Chinese concubine, Lady Cao.

In 1140 a group of Khitan exiles led by Xiao Heda rebelled. The Xia forces under Ren Dejing crushed them. Renzong wanted to reward Ren with a palace appointment but his councilor, Weiming Renzhong, convinced him to keep him as a field commander.

In 1142-3 famine and earthquake caused unrest in Xiazhou. Renzong responded with tax remissions and relief measures.

In 1144 Renzong decreed the establishment of schools throughout the country and a secondary school opened for imperial scions aged seven to fifteen. A Superior School of Chinese Learning was opened the following year and Confucian temples were built throughout the land. In 1147 imperial examinations were instituted, although Tangut records do discuss using them for selection of officials. The Tangut law code only discusses inheritance of office and rank. In 1148 an Inner Academy was established and staffed with renowned scholars. Renzong also greatly patronized Buddhist learning. The majority of the Tangut Tripitaka was completed during his reign. In 1189, the 50th anniversary of Renzong's accession, 100,000 copies of the "Sutra on the visualization of the Maitreya Bodhisattva's ascent and rebirth in Tushita Heaven" (Guan Mile pusa shang sheng Toushuai tian jing) was printed and distributed in both Chinese and Tangut, and 50,000 copies of other sutras were also printed.

After the deaths of Renzhong and Chage in 1156, Ren Dejing rose through the ranks and became very powerful. In 1160 he obtained the noble title of Chu, the first Chinese to do so in the Tangut state. Ren tried to have the schools shut down and called them useless Chinese institutions wasting resources on parasitic scholars. It is unknown how the emperor responded but the schools were not closed. In 1161 the emperor opened a Hanlin Academy to compile the Xia historical records.

In 1161-2 the Tanguts briefly occupied territory of both the Jurchen Jin dynasty and Song dynasty during the Jin–Song Wars.

From 1165 to 1170, Ren Dejing tried to establish his own semi-autonomous realm, and in the process meddled in the affairs of the Zhuanglang tribes, who lived in the border region of the Tao River valley. He also tried to enlist the help of the Jurchens, but they refused his overtures. Ren started construction of fortifications along the Jin border. In 1170 Ren pressured Renzong to grant him the eastern half of the realm as well as for Emperor Shizong of Jin to grant him investiture. In the summer of that year, Renzong's men secretly rounded up Ren Dejing and his adherents, executing them.

Wo Daochong succeeded Ren Dejing as chief minister. A Confucian scholar, he translated the Analects and provided commentary to it in the Tangut language. Upon his death, Renzong honored him by having his portrait displayed in all the Confucian temples and schools.

The Jurchens closed down border markets in Lanzhou and Baoan in 1172 and would not reopen them until 1197. They accused the Tanguts of trading worthless gems and jades for their silk. Tangut border raids increased during this period until the Jurchens reopened one market in 1181. In 1191 some Tangut herdsmen strayed into Jurchen territory and was chased away by a Jin patrol. They them ambushed and killed the pursuing patrol officer. Renzong refused to extradite the herdsmen and assured the Jurchens that they would be punished.

Renzong died in 1193 at the age of 70.

Huanzong (1193–1206)

The 17-year-old Chunyou succeeded his father, Emperor Renzong of Western Xia, as emperor, posthumously Emperor Huanzong of Western Xia. Little besides the rise of Temüjin and his conflict with Western Xia is known about Huanzong's reign. In 1203, Toghrul was defeated by Temüjin. Toghrul's son, Nilqa Senggum, fled through Tangut territory and although the Tanguts refused to provide him with refuge, and he raided their territory, Temüjin used this as pretext to raid Western Xia. The resulting attack in 1205 caused one local Tangut noble to defect to the Mongols, the plundering of several fortified settlements, and loss of livestock.

In 1206, Temüjin was formally proclaimed Genghis Khan, ruler of all Mongols, marking the official start of the Mongol Empire. In the same year, Huanzong was deposed in a coup by his cousin Anquan, who installed himself as Emperor Xiangzong of Western Xia. Huanzong died much later in captivity.

Xiangzong (1206–1211)

In 1207, Genghis led another raid into Western Xia, invading the Ordos Loop and sacking Wulahai, the main garrison along the Yellow River, before withdrawing in the spring of 1208. The Tanguts tried to form a united front with the Jurchen Jin dynasty against the Mongols, but the usurper monarch, Wanyan Yongji, refused to cooperate and declared that it was to their advantage that enemies attack one another.

In the autumn of 1209, Genghis received the submission of the Uyghurs to the west and invaded Western Xia. After defeating an army led by Gao Lianghui outside Wulahai, Genghis captured the city and pushed up along the Yellow River, capturing several garrisons and defeating another imperial army. The Mongols besieged the capital, Zhongxing, which held a well-fortified garrison of 150,000, and attempted to flood the city by diverting the Yellow River. The dike they built broke and flooded the Mongol camp, forcing them to withdraw. In 1210, Xiangzong agreed to submit to Mongol rule, and demonstrated his loyalty by giving a daughter, Chaka, in marriage to Genghis and paying a tribute of camels, falcons, and textiles.

After their defeat in 1210, Western Xia attacked the Jin dynasty in response to their refusal to aid them against the Mongols. The following year, the Mongols joined Western Xia and began a 23-year-long campaign against Jin. In the same year Xiangzong's nephew Zunxu seized power in a coup and became Emperor Shenzong of Western Xia. Xiangzong died a month later.

Shenzong (1211–1223)
Emperor Shenzong of Western Xia was the first person in the imperial family to pass the palace examinations and receive a jinshi degree.

Shenzong appeased the Mongols by attacking the Jurchens and in 1214, supported a rebellion against the Jurchens. In 1216, Western Xia provided auxiliary troops to the Mongols for an attack on Jin territory. The Tanguts also invited the Song dynasty to join them in attacking the Jin, but nothing came of this except an aborted joint action in 1220. The antagonistic policy towards the Jurchen Jin was unpopular at court, as was cooperating with the Mongols. A certain Asha Gambu emerged as an outspoken proponent of anti-Mongol policy. In the winter of 1217-18, the Mongols called on Western Xia to provide them troops for campaigns further west, but they refused to comply. No immediate retaliation occurred since Genghis left for the west in 1219 and left Muqali in charge of North China. In 1223, Muqali died. At the same time, Shenzong abdicated to his son, Dewang, posthumously Emperor Xianzong of Western Xia.

Xianzong (1223–1226)

Emperor Xianzong of Western Xia began peace talks with the Jurchen Jin in 1224 and the peace agreement was finalized in the fall of 1225. The Tanguts continued to defy the Mongols by refusing to send a hostage prince to the Mongol court.

After defeating Khwarazm in 1221, Genghis prepared his armies to punish Western Xia. In 1225, Genghis attacked with a force of approximately 180,000. According to the Secret History of the Mongols, Genghis was injured in 1225 during a horse hunt when his horse bolted from under him. Genghis then tried to offer Western Xia the chance to willingly submit, but Asha Gambhu mocked the Mongols and challenged them to battle. Genghis pledged to avenge this insult. Genghis ordered his generals to systematically destroy cities and garrisons as they went.

Genghis divided his army and sent general Subutai to take care of the westernmost cities, while the main force under Genghis moved east into the heart of the Western Xia and took Suzhou and Ganzhou, which was spared destruction upon its capture due to it being the hometown of Genghis's commander Chagaan. After taking Khara-Khoto in early 1226, the Mongols began a steady advance southward. Asha, commander of the Western Xia troops, could not afford to meet the Mongols as it would involve an exhausting westward march from the capital through 500 kilometers of desert, so the Mongols steadily advanced from city to city.

In August 1226, Mongol troops approached Liangzhou, the second-largest city in Western Xia, which surrendered without resistance. In autumn 1226, Genghis crossed the Helan Mountains, and in November laid siege to Lingwu, a mere 30 kilometers from the capital. At this point, Xianzong died, leaving his relative, Xian, posthumously Emperor Mozhu of Western Xia, to deal with the Mongol invasion.

Mo (1226–1227)
Emperor Mo of Western Xia led a 300,000 strong army against the Mongols and was defeated. The Mongols sacked Lingzhou.

Genghis reached the Western Xia capital in 1227, laid siege to the city, and launched several offensives against the Jin to prevent them from sending reinforcements to Western Xia, with one force reaching as a far as Kaifeng, the Jin capital. The siege lasted for six months before Genghis offered terms of surrender. During the peace negotiations, Genghis continued his military operations around the Liupan mountains near Guyuan, rejected a peace offer from the Jin, and prepared to invade them near their border with the Song.

In August 1227, Genghis died of uncertain causes, and, in order not to jeopardize the ongoing campaign, his death was kept a secret.  In September 1227, Emperor Mo surrendered to the Mongols and was promptly executed. The Mongols then pillaged the capital, slaughtered the city's population, plundered the imperial tombs to the west, and completed the annihilation of the Western Xia state.

Destruction
The destruction of Western Xia during the second campaign was nearly total. According to John Man, Western Xia is little known to anyone other than experts in the field due to Genghis Khan's policy calling for their complete eradication. He states that "There is a case to be made that this was the first ever recorded example of attempted genocide. It was certainly very successful ethnocide." However, some members of the Western Xia royal clan emigrated to western Sichuan, northern Tibet, and even possibly Northeast India, in some instances becoming local rulers. A small Western Xia state was established in Tibet along the upper reaches of the Yalong River while other Western Xia populations settled in what are now the modern provinces of Henan and Hebei. In China, remnants of the Western Xia persisted into the middle of the Ming dynasty.

Military

The Western Xia had two elite military units, the Iron Hawks (tie yaozi), a 3,000 strong heavy cavalry unit, and Trekker infantry (bubazi), mountain infantry. The brother of Emperor Chongzong of Western Xia, Chage, mentioned that Trekker infantry had difficulty fighting Mighty-Arm bows, a type of Song dynasty crossbow:

Culture

Language
The kingdom developed a Tangut script to write its own Tangut language, a now extinct Tibeto-Burman language probably related to the Horpa taxon.

Tibetans, Uyghurs, Han, and Tanguts served as officials in Western Xia. It is unclear how distinct the different ethnic groups were in the Xia state as intermarriage was never prohibited. Tangut, Chinese and Tibetan were all official languages.

Dress
In 1034 Li Yuanhao (Emperor Jingzong) introduced and decreed a new custom for Western Xia subjects to shave their heads, leaving a fringe covering the forehead and temples, ostensibly to distinguish them from neighbouring countries. Clothing was regulated for different classes of official and commoners. Dress seemed to be influenced by Tibetan and Uighur clothing.

Religion 
The government-sponsored state religion was a blend of Tibetan Tantric Buddhism and Chinese Mahayana Buddhism with a Sino-Nepalese artistic style. The scholar-official class engaged in the study of Confucian classics, Taoist texts, and Buddhist sermons, while the Emperor portrayed himself as a Buddhist king and patron of Lamas.
Early in the kingdom's history, Chinese Buddhism was the most widespread form of Buddhism practiced. However, around the mid-twelfth century Tibetan Buddhism gained prominence as rulers invited Tibetan monks to hold the distinctive office of state preceptor. The practice of Tantric Buddhism in Western Xia led to the spread of some sexually related customs. Before they could marry men of their own ethnicity when they reached 30 years old, Uighur women in Shaanxi in the 12th century had children after having relations with multiple ethnic Han men, with her desirability as a wife enhancing if she had been with a large number of men.

Economy
The economy of the empire mainly consisted of agriculture, pastoralism, and trade (especially with Central Asia).

Rulers 

Each Western Xia emperor established one or more era name in Chinese and Tangut, although not all the Tangut versions of era names are known.

Gallery

See also 

Eastern Xia
Ethnic groups in Chinese history
History of China
Hongfo Pagoda
Khara-Khoto
List of Tangut books
One Hundred and Eight Stupas
Tangut people
Tangutology

References

Citations

Sources 

 .
 
 
  (alk. paper)
 
 
 
 
  (paperback).
 
 
 
 
 
 .

External links 

 宁夏新闻网 (Ningxia News Web): 西夏研究 (Xixia Research).
 宁夏新闻网 (Ningxia News Web): 文化频道 (Cultural Channel).

 
Dynasties in Chinese history
Former countries in Chinese history
Xia
Tangut history
11th century in China
12th century in China
13th century in China
States and territories established in 1038
States and territories disestablished in 1227
1030s establishments in Asia
1220s disestablishments in Asia